Hungarian Liberal Party (shortened form Liberals (Liberálisok) or MLP) is a liberal political party in Hungary that was formed on 27 April 2013 and is led by Anett Bősz.

History

Foundation
Gábor Fodor announced in January 2013 that he intended to establish a new liberal party in Hungary. He presented his party in April 2013, promising "more liberal, person-centered and patriotic politics". Fodor is a former Minister of Education and a former member of Fidesz and of the Alliance of Free Democrats (SZDSZ). He criticized the state's tutelary policy and emphasized, Hungary was then in forefront of the region, when liberalism and the SZDSZ were strong. Fodor also introduced the party's programme with the title of "Sympathetic liberalism", breaking away from the "intellectual arrogance" of his previous party.

In September 2013, the Hungarian Socialist Party (MSZP) declined to sign an election deal with the Democratic Coalition (DK) and the Hungarian Liberal Party because both parties presented excessive expectations compared to their social support. According to Fodor, the Liberals were ready to enter into a far-reaching compromise with left-leaning opposition parties in order to defeat Viktor Orbán. But after the Socialists and Together 2014 – the grouping led by former PM Gordon Bajnai – opted to stand apart, the Liberals had no other choice but to set off for the 2014 national election on their own. Fodor attended as a public speaker at the opposition demonstration on the 1956 Revolution National Day, where he urged the establishment of a common democratic opposition list for the 2014 parliamentary election, criticizing agreement between the MSZP and Together 2014 and the exclusion of other opposition parties from the cooperation.

During the interim mayoral election in Fót, held on November 24, Liberal candidate Nóra Mária Vargha received 13 percent of the votes to come in fifth place. Fodor argued that this showed that liberals needed a party to call their own and that a lack of cooperation of opposition parties would only help the ruling Fidesz. Later, a Budapest court decided the annulment of election results because of a violation of campaign silence rules. On 20 December 2013, Századvég polls recorded support for the Hungarian Liberal Party for the first time, at about 1% of the vote.

Parliamentary presence
On 14 January 2014, the Hungarian Liberal Party joined the Unity electoral alliance of left-wing opposition parties, which was led by chairman of the Socialist Party Attila Mesterházy and contested the 2014 parliamentary elections. Fodor ran as a candidate for MP from the fourth place of the alliance's national list. The party also received two additional places (56th and 58th) on the list. Although Unity as a whole suffered a heavy defeat in the elections, Fodor became a Member of Parliament again after four years and did not join any parliamentary group.

On 19 November 2015, the party was admitted to the Alliance of Liberals and Democrats for Europe.

The Hungarian Liberal Party was the only political party to openly campaign in favour of the EU's compulsory migrant quota system and asked its supporters to vote "yes" in the October 2016 migrant quota referendum. The MLP's foreign policy advisor István Szent-Iványi said in August 2016 that the support of "yes" votes "is the only way to stand up for European values, Hungary’s belonging to Europe and European solidarity", criticizing the behaviour of left-wing parties that decided to boycott the referendum. Hungarian Liberal Party chairman Gábor Fodor (currently the party’s only MP) submitted a bill in 2017 calling for the legalization and regulation of cannabis in Hungary. In economic matters, the party supports flat tax.

Alliance with the Democratic Coalition

In the 2018, Anett Bősz was elected to the National Assembly from the joint MSZP–P list. Under the agreement, she became a member of the Dialogue for Hungary (PM) parliamentary group. Ten days after the inaugural meeting of the new national assembly, Anett Bősz left the Dialogue faction on 18 May 2018. It was revealed that Socialist party chairman Gyula Molnár, prime minister-candidate Gergely Karácsony and Liberal party chairman Fodor agreed before the election that the MSZP would allocate 60 million HUF annually to MLP from its own state budget, unless the party started separately. However, the MSZP party leadership did not know about this and the party did not consent to it, which also raised suspicions of illicit party support. Bősz's withdrawal reduced the faction's membership to less than five, which would have resulted in its dissolution. However, Tamás Mellár, an independent Member of Parliament, joined the Dialogue faction on 20 May.

Bősz was an independent MP from May 2018 to December 2019. In April 2019, Fodor resigned the MLP's chairman position and Bősz was elected as his successor in December 2019. She joined the Democratic Coalition group in the National Assembly in the same month. Under her presidency, the MLP gradually became a de facto satellite party of the Democratic Coalition. Its members, Bősz herself and Ádám Sermer ran under DK banner in both 2021 opposition primary and 2022 Hungarian parliamentary election. Only another member Viktor Szabadai announced his candidacy in Csorna constituency under MLP banner in the 2022 national election; if the party did not run in the election, the court would dissolve it under current law (since it did not run under its own banner in 2018 too). Szabadai asked opposition voters not to vote for him but to support the candidate of the United for Hungary, of which DK (and thus MLP) is a member. Both Bősz and Sermer were defeated by the candidates of Fidesz in their respective constituencies in the 2022 election, leaving the Liberal Party without parliamentary representation after eight years.

Leadership
 Anett Bősz: chairman
 András Boruzs: party manager
 Viktor Szabadai: party chairman in Budapest
 István Szent-Iványi: foreign policy advisor

History of leaders

Election results

National Assembly

Local elections - Budapest

See also
 List of political parties in Hungary

References

External links
Official website 
Facebook 
Twitter 
YouTube 

Political parties established in 2013
2013 establishments in Hungary
Liberal parties in Hungary
Pro-European political parties in Hungary
Organisations based in Budapest
Opposition to Viktor Orbán